Frederiksberg RK is a Danish rugby union club based in Frederiksberg (Copenhagen area). The senior team competes in the DRU Division One. The club also includes a women's team and a vibrant youth section.

History 
The club was founded in 1975 by Erik Andersen, who then served as Chairman of the Danish Rugby Union (1969-1996), to provide the proper sports infrastructure for his children and their friends in the city of Frederiksberg.

Recent Internationally-Capped Players 

  Tomas Mayne
  Rasmus Greve
  Emil Svinth Aagaard
  Michael Attali Strøyberg
  Andrei Ungureanu
  Eugene Hanrahan
  Erwan Caquineau
  Thomas Hobbs
  Rasmus Madum
  Cassius Deschamps
  Otto Kaszner
  Thomas Thimothée
  Geoffroy Gauthier
  Hamish Coventry
  Nikolay Hinov
  Jānis Podiņš
  Unai Arrieta Armendariz

Honours
Danish Championship
 1992, 1993, 2002, 2003, 2004, 2005, 2015, 2018, 2019, 2021*.
Danish Cup
 1992, 1994, 1998, 1999, 2001, 2004, 2005, 2006.

The 2020 Danish Championship was not disputed due to the COVID-19 pandemic.

External links
Frederiksberg RK

Danish rugby union teams